The American West Football Conference (AWFC) is a professional indoor American football minor league created in 2018 by Platinum Events & Security, LLC, the owners of the Idaho Horsemen. The league's inaugural season was in 2019.

Players are paid $150 per game before taxes with no other benefits, although the teams help the players find host families during the season. Teams' operating budget is $200,000 per season.

The league has a inter-league scheduling agreement with the American Indoor Football Alliance.

History
After being unable to join the Indoor Football League or Champions Indoor Football citing league instability, as well as financial and travel issues due to the distance from the rest of the leagues' teams, Chris Reynolds, owner of the Idaho Horsemen announced that his ownership group Platinum Events & Security, LLC, created a new indoor league, the American West Football Conference (AWFC). The league was created to fill the void of a lack of west coast teams and leagues and to decrease travel costs of operating the regional teams. The league was announced with four teams: the Horsemen, Reno Express, Tri-Cities Fire, and the Wenatchee Valley Skyhawks. The AWFC later added the Sacramento Spartans, but the team's facilities did not meet league standards and was removed a month before the start of the season.

The first game in league history was the Wenatchee Valley Skyhawks at the Idaho Horsemen on March 23, where the Horsemen won 33–22. The season's first forfeit came on May 4 when the Skyhawks did not travel to play the Reno Express, who instead played a local semiprofessional team in order to fulfill its lease agreement. The following week, the only scheduled game was also postponed citing travel issues with the Tri-Cities Fire visiting Idaho, but was made-up on June 19. Idaho went undefeated and won the championship game 40–20 over Reno.

For the 2020 season, the league announced expansion teams in Yakima, Washington, and the San Francisco Bay Area, although the Bay Area team never launched. In February 2020, the Reno Express was removed from the schedule and the Tri-Cities Fire folded, which led to the Idaho Horsemen and Wenatchee Valley Skyhawks both announce they would play independent schedules. The league then announced it would be playing the 2020 season with three teams — Idaho, Wenatchee, and Yakima — while looking for non-league teams to fill in the lost games including the minor outdoor team, Tri-City Rage, filling in for the Fire's six scheduled away games.

On March 13, 2020, the AWFC announced on its website that the 2020 season would be postponed due to the ongoing COVID-19 pandemic, citing the high number of cases reported from Washington, one of two states that had a team in the league. On July 31, 2020, the AWFC announced the cancellation of the 2020 season due to the unavailability of arenas during the pandemic.  On September 28, 2020, the league announced a new expansion team in the state of Oregon for the 2021 season called the Oregon High Desert Storm. On November 13, 2020, the Tri-Cities were announced as the league's new franchise, which was named the Tri-City Rush a day later.

On November 22, 2022 league champions Tri-City Rush announced they are folding after home arena in Pasco shut down for the 2023 season and not meeting their financial goals. With only three teams for the 2023 season, the AWFC announced they will play crossover games with four teams from the American Indoor Football Alliance, while Cali Gold (San Francisco Bay area) from the American Arena League 2 will play one game against each of the AWFC teams.

Teams

Current

Former teams
Reno Express (Reno, Nevada) – played the 2019 season but withdrew from the 2020 season.
Tri-Cities Fire (Kennewick, Washington) – played the 2019 season and folded before the 2020 season.
Yakima Canines (Yakima, Washington) – joined for the 2020 season before it was cancelled due to the pandemic, played the 2021 season, and the franchise was revoked prior to the 2022 season due to not meeting league minimum operating requirements. The Canines were replaced by the Washington Elite travel team to fill the rest of the league's home schedule.
SoCal Redtails (City of Industry, California) - Originally the San Diego Red Tails, joined for 2022 but never played. The independent Cali Gold filled in the rest of the league teams home schedule.
Tri-Cities Rush (Pasco, Washington) - Played the 2021 & 2022 seasons. Folded Nov. 2022.

Seasons

2019 season

Standings
Final standings.

y – clinched regular season title

x – clinched playoff spot

Playoffs

2021 season

Standings
Final standings.

y – clinched regular season title

x – clinched playoff spot

Playoffs

2022 season

Standings
Final standings.

y – clinched regular season title

x – clinched playoff spot

Playoffs

References

External links
 Official Website

Sports leagues established in 2018
Indoor American football leagues in the United States
2018 establishments in Idaho
Professional sports leagues in the United States